Prime Minister's Awards for Literary Achievement is a New Zealand literary award established in 2003 by the Arts Council of New Zealand Toi Aotearoa (Creative New Zealand), the national arts development agency of the New Zealand government. Each winner in three categories of fiction, nonfiction and poetry receives a monetary award of NZ$60,000.

Winners
Source:

2022

 Fiction: Stephanie Johnson
 Nonfiction: Vincent O'Malley
 Poetry:  James Norcliffe

2021

 Fiction: David Hill
 Nonfiction: Claudia Orange
 Poetry: Anne Kennedy

2020

 Fiction: Tessa Duder
 Nonfiction: Tīmoti Kāretu
 Poetry: Jenny Bornholdt

2019

 Fiction: Elizabeth Knox
 Nonfiction: Gavin Bishop
 Poetry: Fleur Adcock

2018
Fiction: Renée
Nonfiction: Wystan Curnow
Poetry: Michael Harlow

2017
Fiction: Witi Ihimaera
Nonfiction: Peter Simpson
Poetry: Paula Green

2016
Fiction: Marilyn Duckworth
Nonfiction: Atholl Anderson
Poetry: David Eggleton

2015
Fiction: Roger Hall
Nonfiction: Dame Joan Metge
Poetry: Bernadette Hall

2014
Fiction: Jack Lasenby
Nonfiction: Jock Phillips
Poetry: Ian Wedde

2013
Fiction: Owen Marshall
Nonfiction: Martin Edmond
Poetry: Michele Leggott

2012
Fiction: Albert Wendt
Nonfiction: Gregory O'Brien
Poetry: Sam Hunt

2011
Fiction: Dame Fiona Kidman
Nonfiction: James Belich
Poetry: Peter Bland

2010
Fiction: Joy Cowley
Nonfiction: James McNeish
Poetry: Cilla McQueen

2009
Fiction: C. K. Stead
Nonfiction: Ranginui Walker
Poetry: Brian Turner

2008
Fiction: Lloyd Jones
Nonfiction: W. H. Oliver
Poetry: Elizabeth Smither

2007
Fiction: Fiona Farrell
Nonfiction: Dick Scott
Poetry: Bill Manhire

2006
Fiction: Patricia Grace
Nonfiction: Judith Binney
Poetry: Vincent O'Sullivan

2005
Fiction: Margaret Mahy
Nonfiction: Philip Temple
Poetry: Alistair Te Ariki Campbell

2004
Fiction: Maurice Gee
Nonfiction: Anne Salmond
Poetry: Kevin Ireland

2003
Fiction: Janet Frame
Nonfiction: Michael King
Poetry: Hone Tuwhare

References

External links
Prime Minister's Awards for Literary Achievement, official website

New Zealand fiction awards
Awards established in 2003
2003 establishments in New Zealand
New Zealand poetry awards
New Zealand non-fiction literary awards